List of the National Register of Historic Places listings in Nassau County, New York

This list is intended to provide a comprehensive set of listings on the National Register of Historic Places in Nassau County, New York. It includes 150 buildings, structures, sites, objects or districts listed on the U.S. National Register of Historic Places. Four of these are further designated National Historic Landmarks, and one is a National Historic Site operated by the National Park Service.

NRHP Listings by Town

Hempstead

There are 32 places listed on the NRHP in the town of Hempstead.

North Hempstead

There are 51 places listed in the town of North Hempstead.

Oyster Bay

There are 69 places listed in the town of Oyster Bay.

See also
National Register of Historic Places listings in New York
List of Town of Oyster Bay Landmarks

References

Nassau County

Nassau County, New York